Eric Otto Valdemar Lemming (22 February 1880 – 5 June 1930) was a Swedish track and field athlete who competed at the 1900, 1906, 1908 and 1912 Olympics in a wide variety of events, which mostly involved throwing and jumping. He had his best results in the javelin throw, which he won at the 1906–1912 Games, and in which he set multiple world records between 1899 and 1912. His last record, measured at 62.32 m, was ratified by the International Association of Athletics Federations as the first official world record.

Javelin throw was not part of the 1900 Olympics, where Lemming finished fourth in the hammer throw, high jump and pole vault. At the 1906 Intercalated Games he won a gold medal in the javelin throw and three bronze medals, in the shot put, tug of war and ancient pentathlon, which consisted of a standing long jump, discus throw (ancient style), javelin throw, 192 m run, and a Greco-Roman wrestling match. He also finished fourth in the discus throw and stone throwing contests.

At the 1908 Olympics, Lemming won two gold medals in two types of javelin throw, and finished eighth in the hammer throw. He won another gold medal in the javelin at his last Olympics in 1912, where his half-brother Oscar placed tenth in pentathlon. Lemming died on 5 June 1930 at the age of 50.

References

External links 

 De Wael, Herman. Herman's Full Olympians: "Athletics 1900".  Accessed 18 March 2006..
 

1880 births
1930 deaths
Swedish pentathletes
Swedish male javelin throwers
Swedish male shot putters
Olympic gold medalists for Sweden
Olympic bronze medalists for Sweden
Athletes (track and field) at the 1900 Summer Olympics
Tug of war competitors at the 1906 Intercalated Games
Athletes (track and field) at the 1906 Intercalated Games
Athletes (track and field) at the 1908 Summer Olympics
Athletes (track and field) at the 1912 Summer Olympics
Olympic athletes of Sweden
Olympic tug of war competitors of Sweden
Örgryte IS Friidrott athletes
Medalists at the 1912 Summer Olympics
Medalists at the 1908 Summer Olympics
Medalists at the 1906 Intercalated Games
Olympic gold medalists in athletics (track and field)
Olympic bronze medalists in athletics (track and field)
Athletes from Gothenburg
Olympic male high jumpers